Resource planning may refer to:

 Enterprise resource planning (ERP), a kind of business-management software
 Manufacturing resource planning (MRP and MRPII), a method for handling resources of a manufacturing company
 Distribution resource planning (DRP), a method for planning orders within a supply chain
 Human resources planning (HR), the consideration of HR needs in overall goals and strategies
 Natural resource management, the management of natural resources such as land, water, soil, plants and animals